Charles Haslewood Shannon  (26 April 1863 – 18 March 1937) was an English artist best known for his portraits. These appear in several major European collections, including London's National Portrait Gallery. Several authorities spell his middle name Hazelwood. The National Portrait Gallery prefers the spelling used here.

Biography
Shannon was born in Sleaford, Lincolnshire, son of the Rev. Frederick William Shannon, Rector of Quarrington, and Catherine Emma Manthorp, daughter of a surgeon, Daniel Levett Manthorp. He was educated at St John's School, Leatherhead where he played cricket in the first XI. He then attended the City and Guilds of London Art School (then known as South London School of Technical Art, formerly Lambeth School of Art) and was later much influenced by his lifetime partner, Charles Ricketts and by the example of the great Venetians. His early work has a heavy, low tone, which he later abandoned for clearer, more transparent colours. He achieved success with his portraits and his Giorgionesque figure compositions, which are marked by a classic sense of style, and with his etchings and lithographic designs.

Dublin Municipal Gallery owns his circular work The Bunch of Grapes and The Lady with the Green Fan (a portrait of Mrs Hacon). Another subject was the popular novelist Mary Frances Dowdall. His Study in Grey is at the Munich Gallery, a Portrait of Mr Staats Forbes at Bremen, and Souvenir of Van Dyck at Melbourne. One remarkable picture is The Toilet of Venus, once in the collection of Lord Northcliffe, and later Tate Britain. Later works include The Amethyst Necklace (1907), The Morning Toilet (1911), The Embroidered Shawl (1914), and The Incoming Tide (1918). Also in 1918 he produced various portraits, including those of Princess Patricia of Connaught, Lillah McCarthy, and the actress Hilda Moore. Among his lithographs were Playmates (1908), Ebb Tide (1917), The Tidal River and A Sharp Corner (1919).

Shannon was elected as Associate of the Royal Academy in 1911 and in 1918 became vice-president of the International Society of Sculptors, Painters and Gravers. In 1920 he was elected RA.

Several of his portrait works appear in London's National Portrait Gallery.

Complete sets of his lithographs and etchings were acquired by the British Museum and the Berlin and Dresden print rooms. He was awarded a first-class gold medal at Munich in 1895 and a first-class silver medal in Paris in 1900.

Personal life
Shannon and Ricketts met as teenagers and cohabited in Chelsea for over 50 years until Rickets died. They also worked together on many projects. Together they designed and illustrated books, set up an art journal, and created the Vale Press, which published over 75 books before it closed in 1904. Shannon became disabled in 1928 after a fall while hanging a picture. The neurological damage he suffered caused amnesia and ended his career.

References

External links

Guide to the Carl Woodring collection on Charles Ricketts and Charles Shannon, 1846-2001 (Woodson Research Center, Fondren Library, Rice University, Houston, TX, USA)
 

1865 births
1937 deaths
19th-century English painters
19th-century English LGBT people
19th-century English male artists
20th-century British printmakers
20th-century English painters
20th-century LGBT people
British illustrators
Alumni of the City and Guilds of London Art School
English male painters
English portrait painters
English wood engravers
English LGBT painters
People educated at St John's School, Leatherhead
People from Sleaford, Lincolnshire
Royal Academicians
20th-century English male artists
20th-century engravers